Finn Ross (born 1982) is a Scottish video designer working internationally. He works primarily on stage productions in the London's West End and on Broadway in the USA.  He has also worked extensively in opera throughout Europe and has collaborated with designers like Es Devlin and theatre companies like Complicite. Ross has won a Tony Award and two Olivier Awards.

Early life and education 
Ross was born and raised in Glen Tanar, Aberdeenshire.  He was educated at Aboyne Academy where he became interested in theatre thanks to his drama teacher, Yevonne Wheeler.  He also spent time at The Scottish Youth Theatre.

He studied at Central School of Speech and Drama in London from 2000 to 2003 earning a Bachelor of Arts degree in Theatre Practise.

Career 
Ross began his career in 2005 being mentored by Dick Straker and Sven Ortel of the video design collective Mesmer, working as an associate on many of their productions and later designing for them.

Notable work in Broadway and the West End includes Chimerica, Curious Incident of the Dog in the Night Time, Betrayal, American Psycho, Harry Potter and the Cursed Child, Frozen, Mean Girls, Bat Out of Hell, Top Girls & The Tempest at the RSC.

Ross has design many opera productions, especially at the ENO and has been cited as part of the movement of Video designers who helped develop the form to maturity.  Notable work in opera includes The Magic Flute for DNO and ENO, The Damnation of Faust with Terry Gilliamat The ENO, The Death of Klinghoffer for ENO and The Met and The Rise and Fall of the City of Mahagonny at the ROH and Turn of the Screw, Beatrice & Benedict and Pearl Fishers & La Traviata at Theatre an der Wein.

He has also had collaborations with British Theatre director Simon McBurney and his company Complicite, designing 4 shows over a 10-year period.

Ross is also a Design Champion of the V&A Dundee.

In 2015 he formed FRAY Studio in Partnership With Adam Young.

In December 2019 he was made an Honorary Fellow of the Royal Central School of Speech and Drama

Awards and nominations

References

External links 
Personal Website

1982 births
Living people
People from Aberdeenshire
Alumni of the Royal Central School of Speech and Drama
Scottish scenic designers
Laurence Olivier Award winners
Tony Award winners